The Confédération Nationale des Travailleurs Burkinabé (trans. National Confederation of Workers of Burkina; CNTB) is a trade union centre in Burkina Faso. It is affiliated with the International Trade Union Confederation. CNTB emerged from the Confédération africaine des travailleurs croyants.

References

 
 International Labour Standards Archived Report

International Trade Union Confederation
Trade unions in Burkina Faso
Trade unions established in 1950